Joël Patrice Keller (born 6 March 1995) is a Swiss professional footballer who most recently played as a defender for SC Weiche Flensburg 08.

As of September 2020, Keller had left professional football and was playing for a German lower-league club.

References

External links
 

1995 births
Living people
Swiss men's footballers
Association football defenders
1. FC Nürnberg II players
FC St. Pauli players
SC Weiche Flensburg 08 players
2. Bundesliga players
Regionalliga players
Swiss expatriate footballers
Swiss expatriate sportspeople in Germany
Expatriate footballers in Germany